Bertha Bele (3 March 1893 – 14 April 1967) was a Norwegian politician for the Labour Party.

She served as a deputy representative to the Parliament of Norway from the Market towns of Møre og Romsdal county during the terms 1945-1949 and 1950–1953. In total she met during 56 days of parliamentary session. She hailed from Ålesund.

References

1893 births
1967 deaths
Deputy members of the Storting
Labour Party (Norway) politicians
Møre og Romsdal politicians
Politicians from Ålesund
Women members of the Storting
20th-century Norwegian women politicians
20th-century Norwegian politicians